Uhse is a German surname. Notable people with this surname include:

 Beate Uhse-Rotermund (1919–2001), German pilot and entrepreneur
 Bodo Uhse (1904–1963), German writer, journalist, and political activist
 Janina Uhse (born 1989), German actress

German-language surnames